Marcin Tomasz Stolarski (born 4 January 1996) is a Polish swimmer. He competed in the men's 100 metre breaststroke event at the 2016 Summer Olympics.

References

External links
 

1996 births
Living people
Polish male breaststroke swimmers
Olympic swimmers of Poland
Swimmers at the 2016 Summer Olympics
Swimmers from Warsaw